The Stranger in the Snow is a novel by the American writer Lester Goran set in the 1960s in Pittsburgh, Pennsylvania.

It tells the story of Harry Meyers, who is haunted by the ghost of man named Wilson who was killed, he thought, in Harry's place during World War II.

References

1966 American novels
Novels by Lester Goran
Novels set in Pittsburgh